Eddy Lecygne (born 6 August 1996) is a French professional footballer who plays as a midfielder for Lamballe.

Playing career
Lecygne joined Premier League club Stoke City in early 2012 after previously playing in the youth teams at EA Guingamp, Stade Rennais and Lamballe. He joined League One side Doncaster Rovers on a one-month loan deal on 25 January 2016. He made his debut in the Football League the following day, in a 2–1 defeat to Port Vale at the Keepmoat Stadium. Lecygne was released by Stoke in June 2018.

After release from Stoke, Lecygne returned to France and joined Régional 1 side Lamballe.

Career statistics

References

External links
 

1996 births
Living people
Sportspeople from Côtes-d'Armor
French footballers
French expatriate footballers
France youth international footballers
Association football midfielders
En Avant Guingamp players
Stade Rennais F.C. players
Stoke City F.C. players
Doncaster Rovers F.C. players
English Football League players
Expatriate footballers in England
Footballers from Brittany